The 2008 Craven District Council election took place on 1 May 2008 to elect members of Craven District Council in North Yorkshire, England. One third of the council was up for election and the council stayed under no overall control.

After the election, the composition of the council was
Conservative 15
Independent 10
Liberal Democrats 5

Background
Before the election an alliance between 9 of the 10 independents and the 6 Liberal Democrats controlled the council, with independent Carl Liss as council leader. The 14 Conservative councillors were in opposition, supported by the remaining independent councillor, Ken Hart.

Election result
The Conservatives won 8 of the 11 seats contested, including gaining one seat, to have exactly half of seats on the council. The Conservative gain came in Skipton East where Pam Heseltine took the seat from the Liberal Democrats. This reduced the Liberal Democrats to 5 councillors after they held the other 2 seats they were defending. The only independent councillor to be defending a seat, David Ireton, retained it in Ingleton and Clapham, while the 5 Labour candidates came last in each of the wards they contested.

Following the election Conservative Chris Knowles-Fitton became leader of the council, taking over from independent Carl Lis.

Ward results

References

2008
2008 English local elections
2000s in North Yorkshire